Souers is a surname. Notable people with the surname include:

Jerome Souers (born 1958), American football coach
Sidney Souers (1892–1973), American admiral and intelligence expert